Liu Tong (born November 4, 1993) is a Chinese actor and model. He is best known for his role of Prince Zi Yu in the 2017 web series, Men with Sword 2, as well in the 2019 web series Young Blood Agency.

Biography 
Liu born in Shandong, China, on November 4, 1993. He debuted as an actor in 2017, with a supporting role in the series Painting Heart Expert. Later that same year, he portrayed Prince Zi Yu in the second season of the all-male web series Men with Sword. The series was released on June 15, 2017. In 2018, he was a guest actor in web series Pretty Man and Hi, I'm Saori. In 2019, he will star in the series Young Blood Agency.

Filmography

Web series

References

External links 

 Official web site

1993 births
Living people
Chinese male television actors
Chinese male film actors
21st-century Chinese male actors